Michael T. Longnecker is an American scientist and the George P. Mitchell '44 Endowed Chair in Statistics Science at Texas A&M University, and also a published author of 8 books which are held in 566 libraries, the highest held book being in 449 libraries worldwide.

References

Year of birth missing (living people)
Living people
Texas A&M University faculty
American scientists